Marco Ceron (born 16 June 1992) is an Italian professional basketball player for Pallacanestro Nardò of the Italian Serie A2 Basket. He is a  shooting guard.

Professional career

Clubs
Since 2009 Marco Ceron was owned by Reyer Venezia, where he played in the first two seasons. In 2011 he was sent on loan to Basket Recanati in Serie A2 Basket, and later to Basket Napoli. Due to the exclusion from the 2012-13 A2 season of Napoli, the basketball club and Ceron officially parted ways. So in 2012, he went to Pallacanestro Lago Maggiore, where he won the 2013 Italian LNP Cup and named MVP of the competition.

On 25 June 2013 he went back to Napoli in the Azzurro Napoli Basket club, again in Serie A2.

In 2014 Marco Ceron came back to his original club (Reyer Venezia) where he played in the 2014–15 LBA season, the highest professional basketball league in Italy.

Since 2015 he is a player for VL Pesaro, and in 2016 he signed a two-year contract extension with the club. For the 2017–18 LBA season he became team captain. In July 2018, Ceron left Pesaro after 3 years. However, despite having ended the regular season at the first place and having ousted 3–0 both Pesaro and Tortona in the first two rounds of playoffs, Virtus was defeated 4–2 in the national finals by Olimpia Milano.

On 11 July 2018 Ceron signed a two-year deal with Basket Brescia Leonessa. He played one game due to a skull injury in November 2018. On 4 August 2020 Ceron parted ways with the team.

On 4 October 2020, after a long period of inactivity, Ceron returned to play and joined Scaligera Verona with a short contract just for the Supercoppa LNP, summer trophy of Serie A2, the second tier Italian national league. He ended the 2021-21 season at Stings Mantova in the Serie A2.

On 13 August 2021 Ceron returned to the highest level of the Italian basketball, signing with Virtus Bologna in the Serie A and EuroCup Basketball. On 21 September the team won its second Supercup, defeating Olimpia Milano 90–84. Moreover, after having ousted Lietkabelis, Ulm and Valencia in the first three rounds of the playoffs, on 11 May 2022, Virtus defeated Frutti Extra Bursaspor by 80–67 at the Segafredo Arena, winning its first EuroCup and qualifying for the EuroLeague after 14 years.

On 6 August 2022, Ceron signed a deal with Pallacanestro Nardò, in the Italia Serie A2.

Italy national basketball team
Marco Ceron played many years with the U-20 Italy national basketball team winning silver at the 2011 FIBA Europe Under-20 Championship.

References

External links
Lega Basket Serie A profile  Retrieved 18 October 2017
Legadue Basket profile  Retrieved 18 October 2017
FIBA profile  Retrieved 18 October 2017
FIP profile  Retrieved 18 October 2017

1992 births
Living people
Basket Brescia Leonessa players
Basket Napoli players
Italian men's basketball players
Lega Basket Serie A players
People from Mirano
Reyer Venezia players
Shooting guards
Sportspeople from the Metropolitan City of Venice
Victoria Libertas Pallacanestro players
Virtus Bologna players